The Frantz Round Barn is a historic building that was located near Grand Junction in rural Greene County, Iowa, United States. It was built by Beecher Lamb in 1911. The true round barn measured  in diameter. The barn was constructed in concrete block from Mid-Iowa Concrete of Grand Junction. The interior had a circular around the central silo on the first floor. The second floor had stalls for 12-14 horses, a circular, haymow, and granary. The barn was listed on the National Register of Historic Places since 1986. It has subsequently been torn down.

References

Infrastructure completed in 1911
Buildings and structures in Greene County, Iowa
Barns on the National Register of Historic Places in Iowa
Round barns in Iowa
National Register of Historic Places in Greene County, Iowa